Ahmose-Henutemipet was a princess of the late Seventeenth Dynasty of Egypt. She was a daughter of Pharaoh Seqenenre Tao and probably Queen Ahhotep I. She was the sister of Ahmose I. She bore the titles King's Daughter and King's Sister.

Mummy 
Her mummy was found in the tomb DB320 in 1881 and now is in the Egyptian Museum in Cairo. It was examined by Grafton Elliot Smith in June 1909. Henutemipet died as an old woman; she had grey hair and worn teeth. Her mummy was damaged, probably by tomb robbers. It is likely that the mummy was moved to DB320 after Year 11 of Pharaoh Shoshenq I.

References

16th-century BC women
Princesses of the Seventeenth Dynasty of Egypt
Ancient Egyptian mummies